Gyrodactyloides is a genus of monogeneans in the family Gyrodactylidae.

Species
Gyrodactyloides andriaschewi Bykhovskiĭ & Polyanskiĭ, 1953
Gyrodactyloides baueri Kulachkova, 1970
Gyrodactyloides bychowskii Albova, 1948
Gyrodactyloides dogieli Zhukov, 1960
Gyrodactyloides petruschewskii Bykhovskiĭ, 1947

References

Gyrodactylidae
Monogenea genera